Kamlesh Kumar Patel, Lord Patel of Bradford,  (born 28 September 1960) is a member of the House of Lords. Having been appointed an Officer of the Order of the British Empire (OBE) in the 1999 Birthday Honours, he was created a life peer as Baron Patel of Bradford, of Bradford in the County of West Yorkshire on 8 June 2006.

A qualified Social Worker, he worked in inner city Bradford and then established a number of Third Sector agencies working with those misusing drugs and those with mental health problems; later moving to academia working with a number of universities.

On 19 March 2018, Lord Patel of Bradford was appointed by the Secretary of State for Education and the Secretary of State for Health & Social Care as the Chair of Social Work England.  Social Work England is the regulator for all child, family and adult social workers in England.

Lord Patel of Bradford was previously chair of the Mental Health Act Commission.  He was a commissioner of the Healthcare Commission and The National Treatment Agency for Substance Misuse.  He has over 200 publications and has authored a number of national reports, including The Patel Report into Prison Drug Treatment.

Lord Patel is senior independent director of the England Wales Cricket Board (ECB), appointed in 2016.
He is vice president of the British Board of Film Classification, appointed in May 2018.
He is president of the Royal Society for Public Health and the Institute of Healthcare Management; and patron/chairman of a number of not-for-profit organisations working in the health, education, social care and criminal justice sectors.
He is senior independent director of Cygnet Healthcare and chair of its UK Advisory Board.
He is chair of the Independent Health Providers Network.
He is chair of Breaking Barriers Innovations.
He is chair of the India Business Group.
He is a member of Oxford Somerville India Centre.
He is patron of Southampton University India Centre.
He is advisor to the Global Policy Institute at Queen Mary University London.

On 5 November 2021 he was appointed as a director and chair of Yorkshire County Cricket Club, after the previous chairman Roger Hutton resigned following the result of investigation into racism at Yorkshire County Cricket Club.

Early life
Lord Patel was born on 28 September 1960 in Nairobi, Kenya, to a family of Gujarati descent. His family relocated to the Horton area of Bradford in the early 1960s, and he was educated at the Belle Vue Boys' Grammar School. It was there that he was taken under the wing of two sports teachers, who coached him to become captain of the school cricket team, and as a result he joined the local Manningham Mill cricket club.

Career
Lord Patel spent three years as a social worker with Bradford Council, before going on to work with drug addicts at the Bridge Project, and then setting up his own project to work with vulnerable children.

In March 2018 Lord Patel was appointed the first chair of Social Work England, the new dedicated social work regulator.

Academic/professional qualifications

 Diploma in Social Work DipSW University of Huddersfield (1987) 
 Certificate of Qualification in Social Work CQSW University of Huddersfield (1987) 
 Doctor of Letters (Honoris Causa) Manchester Metropolitan University (2007) 
 Doctor of Civil Law (Honoris Causa) University of Huddersfield (2008) 
 Professor University of Central Lancashire (2001) 
 Professorial Fellow of Public Health: Royal Society of Public Health London (2012) 
 Professorial Fellow of Mental Health: The Institute of Mental Health Nottingham (2012) 
 Doctor of Health (honorary degree) University of Bradford (2017) 
 Honorary Fellowship of the American Public Health Association (2017) 
 Doctor of Science (honorary degree) University of Southampton (July 2018)

Awards

 OBE Awarded Order of British Empire in the Queen's Birthday Honours (1999) for “Services to Ethnic Minority Health Issues”. 
 Long service medal (Special Constable) – West Yorkshire Police (1991) 
 Awarded Plaque of Recognition by the High Commissioner of India and Chairman of the Committee of Honour for “contributions to the enhancement of human welfare and international understanding” Indian High Commission London. (1999) 
 Awarded Glory of India Award and Certificate of Excellence by the India International Friendship Society London (2009) 
 Awarded Annual Award of Achievement for services to Education by The India International Foundation: London (2009) 
 GG2 Leadership Awards - Man of the Year Award for consistent lifetime achievement and contribution to public sector services (2015) AMG Awards London 
 Yorkshire Man of the Year: Award for lifetime contribution to the County of Yorkshire (2016) Yorkshire Society

Government

 Life Peer: House of Lords (Independent) (Labour 2008–2018): Lord Patel of Bradford. (June 2006). 
 Minister: (Labour) Governments Whips Office House of Lords, Government Frontbench Spokesperson (2008 – 2009) for: Department of Communities & Local Government, Ministry of Justice, Cabinet Office, and Attorney General's Office. 
 Shadow Front Bench Minister: (Communities), House of Lords (May 2010 – 2012). 
 Member: Select Committee on the Mental Capacity Act 2005 (2013-2015) 
 Member: Monitors’ Fair Playing Field Review Implementation Group (2013-2015) 
 UK Member: UNICEF's Global Task Force on Water, Sanitation and Hygiene (2006-2010) - an international Task Force that included every major global charity in the world working on water, sanitation and hygiene to develop a strategy with the aim of meeting one of the Millennium Development Goals. 
 Senior Ministerial Advisor: to the Secretary of State (Communities & Local Government), (2008) – advising on the impact and effectiveness of the Government's PREVENT strategy for addressing the growth of extremism. 
 National Strategic Director: National Institute for Mental Health England (2002-2004) 
 National Director: The Department of Health Delivering Race Equality in mental health care programme (DRE). (2004-2006) 
 Chairman: of DRE Board (2004-2006) - a major multi-million pound Government national strategy and action plan that was implemented across England and Wales. DRE was one of the largest mental health race equality programmes ever undertaken and was based on Lord Patel's 10 years of action research. 
 Member: Labour Party Drugs Working Group (non-political advisory appointment) (1989-1990).

References

External links
 Manchester Metropolitan University's Honorands for 2007

People's peers 
Labour Party (UK) life peers
1960 births
Officers of the Order of the British Empire
British people of Gujarati descent
Living people
British politicians of Indian descent
Fellows of the Royal Society for Public Health
People educated at Belle Vue Boys' Grammar School, Bradford
Alumni of the University of Huddersfield
Life peers created by Elizabeth II